Antamenes is an Australasian genus of potter wasps.

References

 environment.gov.au

Potter wasps